Edward "Teddy" Craig (? – ?) was a Scottish footballer who played as a half back for Fulham. He made 161 appearances in all competitions for Fulham between 1922 and 1925, scoring 31 goals, including an equalising goal against Everton in an FA Cup tie in 1926.

References

Scottish footballers
Fulham F.C. players
English Football League players
Association football midfielders